May 1977 is a live album by the rock band the Grateful Dead.  It contains five complete concerts, on 14 CDs.  It was recorded at five consecutive shows, from May 11–17, 1977.  Packaged as a box set, it includes a booklet with a historical essay and photos from the concerts, along with individual liner notes for each show.  Produced as a limited edition of 15,000 numbered copies, it was released on June 11, 2013.

Concerts
The concerts included in May 1977 are:
May 11, 1977 – St. Paul Civic Center, Saint Paul, Minnesota
May 12, 1977 – Auditorium Theatre, Chicago
May 13, 1977 – Auditorium Theatre, Chicago
May 15, 1977 – St. Louis Arena, St. Louis
May 17, 1977 – University of Alabama, Tuscaloosa, Alabama

Critical reception

On Allmusic, Stephen Thomas Erlewine wrote, "The Dead were a couple months away from releasing Terrapin Station, an album that isn't particularly beloved, but the slickness that subsumed the studio record is a plus on-stage, as they're tighter than ever before. This is a Grateful Dead that is less about sonic exploration than it is about grooving, letting slow, easy rhythms ride out for as long as they can. At times, this does mean that "Fire on the Mountain" goes on for a very long time, taking detours into drum solos, but the comfort and ease here are appealing, along with a precision in the rhythms and solos. What impresses most is the consistency: perhaps there are slight lags in momentum along the way, but each of the five concerts is wonderfully entertaining, the sound of the Dead at something of a laid-back peak."

In Rolling Stone, Will Hermes said, "The Grateful Dead's May 8th, 1977 gig at Cornell University is widely considered the ne plus ultra of Dead bootlegs. This 14-disc set, packed in a psychedelic sarcophagus, documents five gigs from later that month. It puts the consensus-maker in perspective, occasionally rivals it and, flaws notwithstanding, shows a band on a hell of a hot streak. Compared to the hard-tripping Sixties edition, this is comfort-food Dead, long on unhurried jams and raggedy country harmonies sweetened by their only-ever female band member, Donna Jean Godchaux."

Track listing

May 11, 1977 – St. Paul Civic Center, Saint Paul, Minnesota
Disc one
First set:
"Promised Land" (Chuck Berry) – 4:54
"They Love Each Other" (Jerry Garcia, Robert Hunter) – 7:38
"Big River" (Johnny Cash) – 6:25
"Loser" (Garcia, Hunter) – 7:39
"Looks Like Rain" (Bob Weir, John Perry Barlow) – 9:18
"Ramble On Rose" (Garcia, Hunter) – 7:48
"Jack Straw" (Weir, Hunter) – 5:54
"Peggy-O" (traditional, arranged by Grateful Dead) – 8:43
"El Paso" (Marty Robbins) – 4:44
"Deal" (Garcia, Hunter) – 5:49
Disc two
"Lazy Lightning" > (Weir, Barlow) – 3:32
"Supplication" (Weir, Barlow) –5:20
"Sugaree" (Garcia, Hunter) –13:49
Second set:
"Samson and Delilah" (traditional, arranged by Grateful Dead) – 7:08
"Brown-Eyed Women" (Garcia, Hunter) – 5:28
"Estimated Prophet" (Weir, Barlow) – 8:38
Disc three
"Scarlet Begonias" > (Garcia, Hunter) – 9:47
"Fire on the Mountain" > (Mickey Hart, Hunter)  – 11:02
"Good Lovin'" (Rudy Clark, Arthur Resnick) – 6:29
"Uncle John's Band" > (Garcia, Hunter) – 9:11
"Space" > (Garcia, Keith Godchaux, Phil Lesh, Weir) – 5:48
"Wharf Rat" > (Garcia, Hunter) – 9:51
"Around and Around" (Berry) – 8:48
Encore:
"Brokedown Palace" (Garcia, Hunter) – 5:34

May 12, 1977 – Auditorium Theatre, Chicago, Illinois
Disc one
First set:
"Bertha" (Garcia, Hunter) – 7:16
"Me and My Uncle" (John Phillips) – 3:04
"Tennessee Jed" (Garcia, Hunter) – 9:32
"Cassidy" (Weir, Barlow) – 5:05
"Peggy-O" (traditional, arranged by Grateful Dead) – 7:52
"Jack Straw" (Weir, Hunter) – 5:45
"They Love Each Other" (Garcia, Hunter) – 7:47
"New Minglewood Blues" (Noah Lewis) – 5:20
Disc two
"Mississippi Half-Step Uptown Toodeloo" > (Garcia, Hunter) – 9:54
"Dancing in the Street" (Marvin Gaye, Ivy Jo Hunter, William "Mickey" Stevenson) – 14:19
Second set:
"Samson and Delilah" (traditional, arranged by Grateful Dead) – 7:07
"Brown-Eyed Women" (Garcia, Hunter) – 5:28
"Estimated Prophet" (Weir, Barlow) – 9:25
"Sunrise" (Donna Jean Godchaux) – 3:46
Disc three
"Terrapin Station" > (Garcia, Hunter) – 10:13
"Playing in the Band" > (Weir, Hart, Hunter) – 8:36
"Drums" > (Hart, Bill Kreutzmann) – 4:06
"Not Fade Away" > (Charles Hardin, Norman Petty) – 14:15
"Comes a Time" > (Garcia, Hunter) – 10:20
"Playing in the Band" (Weir, Hart, Hunter) – 7:00
Encore:
"Johnny B. Goode" (Berry) – 4:18

May 13, 1977 – Auditorium Theatre, Chicago, Illinois
Disc one
First set:
"The Music Never Stopped" (Weir, Barlow) – 8:37
"Ramble On Rose" (Garcia, Hunter) – 7:33
"Cassidy" (Weir, Barlow) – 4:46
"Brown-Eyed Women" (Garcia, Hunter) – 5:35
"New Minglewood Blues" (Lewis) – 5:06
"Friend of the Devil" (Garcia, John Dawson, Hunter) – 8:38
"El Paso" (Robbins) – 4:55
"Jack-a-Roe" (traditional, arranged by Grateful Dead) – 5:56
"Looks Like Rain" (Weir, Barlow) – 8:17
"Scarlet Begonias" > (Garcia, Hunter) – 7:05
"Fire on the Mountain" (Hart, Hunter) – 13:19
Disc two
Second set:
"Samson and Delilah" > (traditional, arranged by Grateful Dead) – 7:24
"Bertha" (Garcia, Hunter) – 6:52
"Estimated Prophet" > (Weir, Barlow) – 9:51
"Drums" > (Hart, Kreutzmann) – 5:47
"The Other One" > (Weir, Kreutzmann) – 16:28
"Stella Blue" > (Garcia, Hunter) – 11:51
"Goin' Down the Road Feeling Bad" > (traditional, arranged by Grateful Dead) – 8:05 (NB: due to tape damage, is from June 8, 1977)
"One More Saturday Night" (Weir) – 5:21 (NB: due to tape damage, is from May 28, 1977)
Encore:
"U.S. Blues" (Garcia, Hunter) – 5:57

May 15, 1977 – St. Louis Arena, St. Louis, Missouri
Disc one
First set:
"Bertha" > (Garcia, Hunter) – 6:34
"Good Lovin'" (Clark, Resnick) – 6:07
"Row Jimmy" (Garcia, Hunter) – 10:51
"New Minglewood Blues" (traditional, arranged by Grateful Dead) – 5:33
"Tennessee Jed" (Garcia, Hunter) – 9:35
"Lazy Lightning" > (Weir, Barlow) – 3:34
"Supplication" (Weir, Barlow) – 4:42
"Jack-a-Roe" (traditional, arranged by Grateful Dead) – 6:24
"Passenger" (Lesh, Peter Monk) – 4:31
"Brown-Eyed Women" (Garcia, Hunter) – 5:16
Disc two
"Dancing in the Street" (Gaye, Ivy Jo Hunter, Stevenson) – 18:49
Second set:
"Estimated Prophet" > (Weir, Barlow) – 11:32
"Eyes of the World" > (Garcia, Hunter) – 12:48
"Drums" > (Hart, Kreutzmann) – 3:13
"Samson and Delilah" (traditional, arranged by Grateful Dead) – 7:28
"Ship Of Fools" (Garcia, Hunter) – 7:41
Disc three
"St. Stephen" > (Garcia, Lesh, Hunter) – 5:28
"Iko Iko" > (James "Sugar Boy" Crawford, Barbara Ann Hawkins, Rosa Lee Hawkins, Joan Marie Johnson) – 3:54
"Not Fade Away" > (Hardin, Petty) – 9:38
"Sugar Magnolia" (Weir, Hunter) – 9:58
Encore:
"Uncle John's Band" (Garcia, Hunter) – 9:06

May 17, 1977 – University of Alabama, Tuscaloosa, Alabama
Disc one
First set:
"New Minglewood Blues" (traditional, arranged by Grateful Dead) – 5:46
"Mississippi Half-Step Uptown Toodeloo" > (Garcia, Hunter) – 10:28
"El Paso" (Robbins) – 4:48
"They Love Each Other" (Garcia, Hunter) – 7:42
"Jack Straw" (Weir, Hunter) – 5:37
"Jack-a-Roe" (traditional, arranged by Grateful Dead) – 5:59 
"Looks Like Rain" (Weir, Barlow) – 8:10
"Tennessee Jed" (Garcia, Hunter) – 8:46
"Passenger" (Lesh, Monk) – 3:36
"High Time" (Garcia, Hunter) – 8:32
"Big River" (Cash) – 6:39
Disc two
"Sunrise" (D.J. Godchaux) – 4:35
"Scarlet Begonias" > (Garcia, Hunter) – 13:02
"Fire on the Mountain" (Hart, Hunter) – 13:14
Second set:
"Samson and Delilah" > (traditional, arranged by Grateful Dead) – 6:43
"Bertha" > (Garcia, Hunter) – 6:16
"Good Lovin'" (Clark, Resnick) – 6:02
"Brown-Eyed Women" (Garcia, Hunter) – 5:34
Disc three
"Estimated Prophet" (Weir, Barlow) – 8:55
"Terrapin Station" > (Garcia, Hunter) – 11:23
"Playing in the Band" > (Weir, Hart, Hunter) – 12:20
"Drums" > (Hart, Kreutzmann) – 4:49
"Wharf Rat" > (Garcia, Hunter) – 12:53
"Playing in the Band" (Weir, Hart, Hunter) – 6:06
Encore:
"Sugar Magnolia" (Weir, Hunter) – 9:15

Notes

Personnel
Grateful Dead
Jerry Garcia – lead guitar, vocals
Donna Jean Godchaux – vocals
Keith Godchaux – keyboards
Mickey Hart – drums
Bill Kreutzmann – drums
Phil Lesh – bass guitar
Bob Weir – rhythm guitar, vocals

Production
Produced by Grateful Dead
Produced for release by David Lemieux
Executive producer: Mark Pinkus
Associate producer: Doran Tyson
Mastering: Jeffrey Norman
Recording: Betty Cantor-Jackson
Tape transfer, time-base correction, restoration: John K. Chester, Jamie Howarth
Archival research: Nicholas Merriwether
Tape research: Michael Wesley Johnson
Art direction, design: Masaki Koike
Photography: James R. Anderson, Alexandra May Hunter
Liner notes: Steve Silberman, Blair Jackson

References

2013 live albums
Grateful Dead live albums
Rhino Records live albums